Edwin Moultrie Lanham was born in Weatherford, Texas on October 11, 1904, in the north central part of Texas where his family settled in the 1868.  His family included his grandfather S. W. T. Lanham, the former Governor of Texas.  His father Edwin Moultrie Lanham, Sr., died when Lanham was four, and his mother, Elizabeth Stephens Lanham, remarried soon after and joined her husband in New York City.

Lanham began writing in Paris, France in 1928, and his writing career spanned many decades, and more than twenty novels.  Lanham married a model Irene Stillman in 1928 in Clinton, CT, and had one daughter Evelyn (nicknamed Linda) in 1942.

His only books to have received significant levels of literary praise were both written in the 1930s. "The Wind Blew West" is his most critically acclaimed work, and contains a fictional retelling of the Warren Wagon Train Raid of 1871 and the subsequent trial of the Native American defendants. In 1940, Lanham received one of the  Guggenheim Fellowships, which funded his novel "Thunder in the Earth".  After World War 2, Lanham ceased writing literary fiction, and his entire writing career focused thereafter on mystery writing.

These detective stories, moreover, remain popular among genre fiction readers.

In addition, three of his detective stories were turned into Hollywood films entitled:  The Senator Was Indiscreet; If I’m Lucky 1946 ; and It Shouldn't Happen to a Dog (1946).

Lanham died on July 24, 1979.

Bibliography

  Sailors Don't Care, Contact Edition, Paris, 1929
  Wind Blew West, 1935
  Banner at Daybreak, 1937
  Another Ophelia, 1938
  The Stricklands, 1939
  Thunder in the Earth, 1942
  Politics is Murder, 1947
  Slug It Slay, 1948 ( Published in the UK as Headline for Murder ) 
  Death of a Corinthian, 1953
  One Murder Too Many, 1953
  The Iron Maiden, 1954
  Murder on My Street, 1958
  Speak Not Evil, 1958
  Six Black Camels, 1961
  Passage to Danger, 1961
  Monkey on a Chain, 1963
  The Clock at 8:16, 1970

References
 Handbook of Texas
  Grave
 Grave of father
 Drawing
 Obituary, New York Times, JULY 25, 1979

1904 births
1979 deaths
 
Writers from Texas
20th-century American writers
20th-century American male writers